The Pollinator Pathway is a participatory art, design and ecology social sculpture initiative founded by the artist and designer Sarah Bergmann. Its objective is to connect existing isolated green spaces and create a more hospitable urban environment for pollinators like bees with a system of ecological corridors of flowering plants by using existing urban infrastructure such as curb space and rooftops.

Pathways

The pathways are composed of individual plots of perennial native plant species on city-owned property, tended by local volunteers.

Bergmann had a related installation, Portal to The Pollinator Pathway, at Seattle Art Museum's Olympic Sculpture Park in 2012. In 2014, she made presentations on the project at Frye Art Museum and Seattle Tilth.

Certification
Since late 2013, Bergmann has offered a certification program for new pathways to use the trademarked Pollinator Pathway name.

Other cities
Cities other than Seattle have explored the idea of connecting landscapes for pollinators. In 2008, about the same time the Seattle project was getting under way, the Canadian Pollination Initiative wrote a paper on a "pollinator park" concept to include "...right-of-way passages, including highways, power lines, gas lines and other maintained corridors can be designed in such a way that they serve as pollinator habitats."

In 2011, a New York author and artist Aaron Birk wrote an illustrated story, The Pollinator's Corridor, about a pathway connecting the city's landscape.

City–citizen discussions
Several cities have used official means to initiate citizen discussions on their own pollinator pathways following Seattle's model, including Redmond, Washington; the Niagara Falls, New York area; and Los Angeles, California via the mayor's blog.

Awards
In 2012, Bergmann received The Stranger'''s Genius Award and Seattle Art Museum's Betty Bowen Award for the project. In 2013, she was named one of Seattle's most influential people of the year by Seattle Magazine'', along with recipients of the award who had created other Seattle area pollinator conservation projects.

Notes

References

Further reading

Tracey Byrne (February 14, 2015) Pollinator Pathway® What Is It Really About? BeePeeking: online journal promoting environmental stewardship and the enhancement of urban ecosystems

External links

 (2015)

Geography of Seattle
Pollination management
Landscape architecture